Leucospilapteryx omissella is a moth of the family Gracillariidae. It is known from all of Europe (except Ireland and the Balkan Peninsula), east through Russia to Japan.

The wingspan is 7–8 mm. Adults are on wing in May and again in August in two generations.

The larvae feed on Artemisia campestris and Artemisia vulgaris. They mine the leaves of their host plant. The mine consists of an upper surface blotch, with a conspicuous yellow-orange tinge. The larva lines the inside of the mine with silk, causing the mine to pucker up strongly. The mine is preceded by a long lower-surface corridor, running along the midrib or the leaf margin. Older larvae start eating parts of the upper epidermis. The black frass is deposited in the centre of the mine. Pupation takes place outside of the mine.

References

Acrocercopinae
Moths of Japan
Moths of Europe
Moths described in 1848